The FIS Nordic World Ski Championships 1927 took place between February 2 and February 5, 1927 in Cortina d'Ampezzo, Italy. Neither Finland nor Norway took part in these championships.

Men's cross country

18 km 
February 3, 1927

The 18 km event returned after not being held at the FIS Nordic World Ski Championships 1926.

50 km 
February 5, 1927

Lindgren's victory margin of 18 minutes is the biggest in the history of the FIS Nordic World Ski Championships

Men's Nordic combined

Individual 
February 2, 1927

Men's ski jumping

Individual large hill 
February 2, 1927

Medal table

References
FIS 1927 Cross country results
FIS 1927 Nordic combined results
FIS 1927 Ski jumping results
results from German Wikipedia
Hansen, Hermann & Sveen, Knut. (1996) VM på ski '97. Alt om ski-VM 1925-1997 Trondheim: Adresseavisens Forlag. p. 37. . 

FIS Nordic World Ski Championships
1927 in Nordic combined
1927 in Italian sport
Sport in Cortina d'Ampezzo
Cross-country skiing competitions in Italy
February 1927 sports events
Nordic skiing competitions in Italy